The rivière des Mares is a tributary of the west bank of the lower part of the Rivière du Gouffre, flowing entirely in the town of Baie-Saint-Paul, in the Charlevoix Regional County Municipality, in the administrative region of Capitale-Nationale, in the province from Quebec, to Canada.

This valley is mainly served by the route 138 (boulevard de Monseigneur-De Laval) which runs along the west side of the Rivière du Gouffre, and the chemin de Louisbourg which partially goes up this valley. The intermediate and upper parts being mountainous have few passable roads. Besides the agricultural area in the Gouffre river valley, forestry is the main economic activity in this valley.

The surface of the Mares River is generally frozen from the beginning of December until the beginning of April; however, safe circulation on the ice is generally done from mid-December to the end of March. The water level of the river varies with the seasons and the precipitation; the spring flood generally occurs in April.

Geography 
The Rivière des Mares rises at the mouth of Lac de la Rivière des Mares. The mouth of this lake is located at:
  south of Lac Rémy, ie the head lake of Remy River;
  north-east of the course of the Sainte-Anne River;
  west of the mouth of the Mares river (confluence with the Gouffre river);
  north-west of Baie-Saint-Paul town center.

  towards the south-east down the mountain, to La Grosse Décharge Ouest (coming from the west);
  south-east to the Pied du Mont stream (coming from the south-west);
  towards the northeast by collecting a stream (coming from the northwest), forming a big curve towards the north to go around a mountain (located on the south side) whose summit reaches  and passing from the south side of the Mountain to Roch, up to the Étangs stream (coming from the north);
  towards the south-east in a deep valley to the Louisbourg stream (coming from the south);
  towards the south-east in a less and less steep valley and crossing the route 138 at the end of the segment, up to the stream of the 'Acul (coming from the northwest);
  to the east, winding through an agricultural area crossing forest islets, then north, to its mouth.

The Mares river flows in a bend on the southwest bank of the Gouffre river in Baie-Saint-Paul. This mouth is located at:
  west of route 138;
  north-west of downtown Baie-Saint-Paul;
  north-west of the confluence of the Rivière du Gouffre and Saint-Laurent river.

Toponymy 
During the history, this river was designated under several names with several orthographic variations: Rivière à la Truite, Ruisseau des Marées, Rivière Lamarre, Rivière des Mars, Rivière de la Mare and finally Rivière des Mares. According to some research that the Commission de toponymie du Québec has learned about, the current official name may have originated in the former Domaine de la Mare à la Truite. The latter takes its name from a small body of water located at the bottom of the valley. The use of the name "Rivière de la Mare" is old since it is found mentioned in the delimitation of the lands of Baie-Saint-Paul in 1716.

The toponym "Rivière des Mares" was formalized on March 25, 1997 at the Place Names Bank of the Commission de toponymie du Québec.

Notes and references

Appendices

Related articles 
 Charlevoix Regional County Municipality
 Baie-Saint-Paul, a city
 Ruisseau du Pied du Mont
 La Grosse Décharge Ouest
 Rivière du Gouffre
 St. Lawrence River
 List of rivers of Quebec

External links 

Rivers of Capitale-Nationale
Charlevoix Regional County Municipality